An Encounter with Faces is a 1978 short documentary film directed by Vidhu Vinod Chopra and produced by K.K. Kapil. It focuses on a group of children in an orphanage. It was nominated in 1979 for an Academy Award for Documentary Short Subject,for outstanding visuals and cinematography.

Awards and nominations

References

External links

, posted by Films Division of India

1978 films
Indian short documentary films
Films directed by Vidhu Vinod Chopra
1970s short documentary films